Jennifer James Herrema  is an American rock music singer-songwriter, record producer, artist, and model best known for her work as one half of the rock band Royal Trux.

Career
Herrema formed Royal Trux with her partner Neil Hagerty and lived with him in Washington, Virginia. After producing several records, the band split in 2001. Herrema then went on to form a new band, RTX, which eventually became the band Black Bananas. She has produced and mixed records with other artists including Bad Wizard. She has published numerous articles on music, art, fashion, and lifestyle subjects in various publications including Vice Magazine.

In 2016, she appeared on The Avalanches' album Wildflower on the song "Stepkids".

References

American women singer-songwriters
Record producers from Virginia
Place of birth missing (living people)
Noise rock musicians
Living people
The Field School alumni
American women record producers
21st-century American women
Singer-songwriters from Washington, D.C.
1967 births